Marx Dormoy is a station on line 12 of the Paris Métro in the districts of La Chapelle and Goutte d'Or and the 18th arrondissement.

The station opened on 23 August 1916 as part of the extension of the Nord-Sud company's line A from Jules Joffrin to Porte de la Chapelle. On 27 March 1931 line A became line 12 of the Métro.

The station is named after Marx Dormoy (1888–1941), a French socialist politician assassinated by Cagoulards. Until 1946 it was called Torcy after the Place de Torcy, named after Colbert de Torcy (1665–1746), who was a nephew of Colbert and a diplomat and Foreign Minister under Louis XIV.

Nearby is the church of Jeanne d'Arc, where Joan of Arc prayed on 3 September 1429 and the la Chapelle market.

Station layout

References
Roland, Gérard (2003). Stations de métro. D’Abbesses à Wagram. Éditions Bonneton.

Paris Métro stations in the 18th arrondissement of Paris
Railway stations in France opened in 1916